Lecanora solaris is a species of crustose lichen in the family Lecanoraceae. Found in the Altai Mountains in Russia, the lichen was described as new to science in 2019 by Lydia Yakovchenko and Evgeny Davydov. The lichen is similar in general morphology to Lecanora somervellii, but can be distinguished from that species by its small, squamulose (scaly) to marginally lobate umbilicate thallus and the persistent margin of its apothecia. The species epithet makes reference to the bright yellow (solaris = "sunny") colour of the lichen.

See also
List of Lecanora species

References

solaris
Lichen species
Lichens described in 2019
Lichens of Eastern Europe